The Chinatown Film Festival (CFF) is a major international competitive Asian film festival in New York City that was established at the end of 2005. It is a non-profit corporation that organizes an annual film festival that is designed to promote cultural exchanges between Asia and the rest of the world. The mission of the film festival is to increase the exposure of Asian culture, while uniting it with other international cultures. It takes place in various venues through Manhattan's Chinatown, and aims to use the highly accessible medium of film to create a new point of contact with Asian cultures, as well as to provide a springboard for greater rebirth of New York's Chinatown, giving it a new international appeal to locals, visitors, businesses, and community members.

History 
The CFF idea was started in 2005 by Simone Tarantino, Edward J. Cuccia and Ammy Lim, who were living and working in Chinatown and realized the need for greater cultural communication between the West and Asia, aiming to serve as a role model for the rest of the world. In 2006, the CFF began partnerships with various cultural associations and community patrons to begin the planning for the various aspects of an international cultural event. The CFF officially became incorporated as a non-profit corporation on December 7, 2006.

Festival Details 
The CFF will screen films that are all from Asia, showcasing the colorful and unique traditions and ideas from the region. At least 250 submissions will be reviewed, 25 of which will be chosen for screening over the five-day period of the festival. The Festival will take place at various locations around New York's Chinatown, such as the official Chinatown Auditorium, as well as at an outdoor screen on the final day of the festival. Thousands are expected to come enjoy the films and share in this special cultural experience.

The Festival is not just for the public in attendance, but also aims to connect filmmakers with distribution companies, and help the artists gain a wider audience and access to greater markets.

Categories 
There will be five categories that the films will be organized in:
 Feature Length
 Documentary
 Short Subject
 Experimental Project
 Animation / Manga
There will also be an Outsider category that will showcase a selection of non-competitive films that will showcase the fascinating traditions and remarkable culture that the CFF aims to embrace.

Awards 
A panel consisting of journalists, film festival directors, and professionals in the industry will judge the films. The criteria they will be looking for are style, technique, creative innovation, and execution. The winner of each category will receive the Golden Dragon Award. From these, five winners will be chosen as the top filmmakers of the festival. These five will be awarded the Grand Award, and the film will be shown at a special outdoor screening. There will also be a Bridge Award and an Audience Award given out in each category.

Other awards that will be bestowed at the festival are:
 Best Production
 Best New Director
 Best Screenplay
 Best Cinematography
 Best Editing
 Best Production Design
 Best Original Score
 Best Actress
 Best Actor

CFF 2008 
The first annual CFF will take place in October 2008, in New York's Chinatown. The theme for the festival is The Bridge: Connecting Cultures Through Film in the Heart of Asian Traditions. There will be 25 films screened plus Outsider films, selected from submissions from all over the Asian continent.

Events 
The Chinese Film Festival (CFF) holds fundraising events in order to promote the upcoming festival in October 2008. On November 9, 2007, the CFF held a Galla Fundraising Event at the Jing Fung Restaurant in the heart of New York City's Chinatown. This fundraising event was a success with over 700 attendees and more than 85 members of Asian and non-Asian media. With the presence of Asian traditional fashions and non-Asian designers the message of the CFF carried through the fashion show by bridging Eastern and Western cultures. The added musical performances of Brenda Lau and caucasian American performers Jillian Steward and Nick Cuccia closed the night with a blend of cultural influences.

The next event will be held December 11, 2007, at the Storefront for Art and Design celebrating photography from Chinatowns' around the world. The photographs featured will portray the artists' "perceptions of Chinatown," and the views of Asian cultures that is commonly misunderstood.

Website 
Starting with the launch of the website in December 2006, the CFF's reach, along with its partners will be endless. Over 3 million estimated people will visit the festival's website after the festival's official start in October 2008. The CFF website will be more than just an Internet site, it will be a gathering for the Asian, American, and other International communities to come together and communicate openly. It will be the host of many of the events of the film festival, such as the logo contest. photography exhibitions, a music challenge, and more. The CFF website will also host a database that will contain at least 50,000 profiled (registered) people, which will include distributors, celebrities, film industry professionals as well as the curious. The website is updated on a monthly/weekly basis until May 2008, then on a weekly/daily basis until the end of the festival.

References

External links
 The official Chinatown Film Festival website

Articles about the Chinatown Film Festival
 North America Life Network
 China Press

2005 establishments in New York City
Film festivals established in 2005
Asian-American film festivals
Asian-American culture in New York City
Chinatown, Manhattan
Film festivals in New York City